The 1982 Meath Senior Football Championship is the 90th edition of the Meath GAA's premier club Gaelic football tournament for senior graded teams in County Meath, Ireland. The tournament consists of 14 teams, with the winner going on to represent Meath in the Leinster Senior Club Football Championship. The championship starts with a group stage and then progresses to a knock out stage.

Navan O'Mahonys were the defending champions after they defeated Skryne in the previous years final, however they lost their crown when losing to eventual champions Walterstown after a Semi-final replay.

This was Ballivor's third period in the senior grade after claiming the 1981 Meath Intermediate Football Championship title.

On 31 October 1982, Walterstown claimed their 3rd Senior Championship title, when defeating Summerhill 1-7 to 0-5 in Pairc Tailteann, Navan. Eamonn O'Brien raised the Keegan Cup for Walterstown while Neil O'Sullivan claimed the 'Man of the Match' award.

Team Changes
 

The following teams have changed division since the 1981 championship season.

To S.F.C.
Promoted from I.F.C.
 Ballivor  -  (Intermediate Champions)

From S.F.C.
Regraded to I.F.C.
 n/a

Group stage

Group A

Round 1
 Castletown 2-8, 0-7 Navan O'Mahonys, Martry, 18/4/1982,
 St. Patrick's 0-7, 0-2 Skryne, Duleek, 18/4/1982,
 Syddan 1-8, 1-3 Seneschalstown, Pairc Tailteann, 18/4/1982,
 Ballivor - Bye,

Round 2
 Navan O'Mahonys 2-4, 0-5 Ballivor, Athboy, 2/5/1982,
 St. Patrick's 0-9, 0-7 Syddan, Pairc Tailteann, 2/5/1982,
 Skryne 4-8, 1-9 Seneschalstown, Duleek, 2/5/1982,
 Castletown -  Bye,

Round 3
 Skryne 5-10, 1-2 Syddan, Pairc Tailteann, 23/5/1982,
 St. Patrick's 0-5, 0-2 Seneschalstown, Duleek, 23/5/1982,
 Castletown 2-6, 1-7 Ballivor, Kells, 30/5/1982,
 Navan O'Mahonys - Bye,

Round 4
 Syddan 2-6, 1-6 Ballivor, Kells, 6/6/1982,
 St. Patrick's 0-10, 0-7 Castletown, Skryne, 6/6/1982,
 Navan O'Mahonys 3-6, 2-7 Seneschalstown, Kilberry, 6/6/1982,
 Skryne - Bye,

Round 5
 Castletown 2-7, 1-5 Syddan, Kells, 4/7/1982,
 Navan O'Mahonys 3-9, 1-13 Skryne, Seneschalstown, 11/7/1982,
 Seneschalstown 4-18, 3-2 Ballivor, Trim, 11/7/1982,
 St. Patrick's - Bye,

Round 6:
 Castletown 2-9, 1-4 Seneschalstown, Pairc Tailteann, 25/7/1982,
 Skryne w, l Ballivor, Pairc Tailteann, 25/7/1982,
 Navan O'Mahonys 1-14, 2-7 St. Patrick's, Dunshaughlin, 1/8/1982,
 Syddan - Bye,

Round 7:
 Navan O'Mahonys w/o, scr Syddan, Kilberry, 22/8/1982,
 Castletown 2-3, 0-5 Skryne, Seneschalstown, 22/8/1982,
 St. Patrick's w/o, scr Ballivor,
 Seneschalstown - Bye,

Semi-final Play-offs:
 Navan O'Mahonys 0-10, 0-4 St. Patrick's, Seneschalstown, 29/8/1982,
 St. Patrick's 2-10, 1-1 Castletown, Seneschalstown, 5/9/1982,

Group B

Round 1
 Gaeil Colmcille 0-7, 0-6 Dunshaughlin, Pairc Tailteann, 28/3/1982,
 Nobber 1-6, 0-8 Walterstown, Kells, 18/4/1982,
 Summerhill 4-7, 1-4 Martinstown/Athboy, Trim, 2/5/1982,
 Trim - Bye,

Round 2
 Nobber 2-6, 2-3 Trim, Kilberry, 25/4/1982,
 Summerhill 0-13, 0-5 Dunshaughlin, Kilmessan, 9/5/1982,
 Martinstown/Athboy 0-8, 1-3 Gaeil Colmcille, Kilskyre, 23/5/1982,
 Walterstown - Bye,

Round 3
 Walterstown 2-9, 1-2 Trim, Athboy, 6/6/1982,
 Summerhill 1-17, 0-1 Gaeil Colmcille, Kildalkey, 6/6/1982,
 Martinstown/Athboy 1-9, 0-5 Dunshaughlin, Trim, 6/6/1982,
 Nobber - Bye,

Round 4
 Nobber 1-11, 1-4 Dunshaughlin, Seneschalstown, 27/6/1982,
 Trim 1-13, 0-5 Gaeil Colmcille, Kilskyre, 27/6/1982,
 Walterstown 0-10, 1-3 Martinstown/Athboy, Kilmessan, 11/7/1982,
 Summerhill - Bye,

Round 5
 Summerhill 1-7, 0-4 Nobber, Pairc Tailteann, 11/7/1982,
 Trim w/o, scr Dunshaughlin, Skryne, 11/7/1982,
 Walterstown 3-13, 0-7 Gaeil Colmcille, Martry, 25/7/1982,
 Martinstown/Athboy - Bye,

Round 6:
 Nobber 2-18, 1-5 Martinstown/Athboy, Kilberry, 18/7/1982,
 Summerhill 1-12, 2-3 Trim, Pairc Tailteann, 18/7/1982,
 Walterstown w/o, scr Dunshaughlin,
 Gaeil Colmcille - Bye,

Round 7:
 Nobber 1-12, 1-6 Gaeil Colmcille, Kilberry, 13/8/1982,
 Walterstown 1-8, 1-4 Summerhill, Kilcloon, 15/8/1982,
 Trim w, l Martinstown/Athboy,
 Dunshaughlin - Bye,

Semi-final Play-offs:
 Summerhill 1-4, 0-7 Walterstown, Pairc Tailteann, 29/8/1982,
 Summerhill 1-9, 1-6 Walterstown, Skryne, 5/9/1982,
 Walterstown 1-9, 1-9 Nobber, Pairc Tailteann, 12/9/1982,
 Walterstown 0-12, 1-6 Nobber, Pairc Tailteann, 26/9/1982,

Knock-out Stages
The winners and runners up of each group qualify for the semi finals.

Semi-finals:
 Summerhill 2-10, 0-6 St. Patrick's, Pairc Tailteann, 12/9/1982,
 Walterstown 0-10, 1-7 Navan O'Mahonys, Kells, 26/9/1982,

Semi-final Replay:
 Walterstown 0-6, 0-5 Navan O'Mahonys, Kells, 17/10/1982,

Final:
 Walterstown 1-7, 0-5 Summerhill, Pairc Tailteann, 31/10/1982,

Leinster Senior Club Football Championship

Preliminary round:
 Athlone 2-5, 1-5 Summerhill, Athlone, 17/10/1982,

References

External links

Meath Senior Football Championship
Meath Senior Football Championship